INDUMIL (a portmanteau of the Spanish words Industria Militar, Military Industry) is a Colombian-based military weapons manufacturer. The company is run by the Colombian government.

History
Indumil was originally known as National Workshop of Mechanic Crafts. It was founded in 1908 as a dependency of the Ministry of War. The institution was renamed Indumil in 1954 as an autonomous organisation.

In 1954 Indumil's main facilities were opened. Its first factory, named General José María Córdova, was intended to produce small arms and ammunition. This facility is located in Soacha, Cundinamarca.
In 1955 a second facility was set up under the name of Santa Bárbara. This second unit makes heavy munitions and artillery equipment for Colombian military forces.

In 1964 an explosives factory under the name Antonio Ricaurte was inaugurated. In 1968 this facility became an integral part of Indumil. In 1975, documentation from Heckler & Koch mentioned that the company was allowed to produce the G3, MP5 and the HK21 under license.

During the 1980s and 1990s the Colombian government started a commercial relationship with Israeli Military Industries. Through a staged process Indumil developed licensed production of IMI Galil rifles for the use of the Colombian military.

In 2000 Indumil was granted a certification ISO 9002/94. During the new millennium Indumil received a number of awards as a defense industry.

Products
List of products:

Rifles

Galil
Galil ACE
Galil Córdova

Handguns
Walther P22
Jericho PSL, PL and FBL
Córdova

Llama Revolver models Cassidy, Scorpion and Martial

Shotguns
Mossberg Maverick
Hatsan Arms shotgun.

Ammunition
5.56×45mm NATO SS109
7.62×51mm NATO M80
.38 Special
.32 Long Colt
9×19mm
7.65×21mm
12 gauge
16 gauge
20 gauge

The 5.56×45mm and 7.62×51mm are also produced in all their variations such as tracer and blank cartridges.

Explosives
M26 grenade H.E
40mm H.E - AP grenade.
IM 60 mm H.E. mortar shell.
IM 81 mm H.E. mortar shell.
IM 120 mm H.E. mortar shell.
IM 125 lb PG aerial bomb.
IM 250 lb PG aerial bomb.
IM 500 lb PG aerial bomb.
50g - 11 kg Satchel charge

All mortar shells, grenades and aerial bombs are also produced in variations made for training.

Miscellaneous
MGL Grenade Launcher
IMC-40 grenade launcher

Indumil's flagship small firearm is the Llama revolver. It is a 6 to 10 shot capacity, caliber .38 Special revolver, which is produced mainly at the General José María Córdova factory.

Indumil is one of two companies that produce the  IMI Galil rifles outside Israel, the other being Denel of South Africa. After two decades of stage by stage manufacturing cycle, the company now fully produces all the necessary parts of the IMI Galil rifle. The company produces the ARM (assault rifle and machine gun).

See also

COTECMAR

References

External links
 

Manufacturing companies of Colombia
Defence companies of Colombia
Government-owned companies of Colombia
Companies based in Bogotá
Manufacturing companies established in 1908
1908 establishments in Colombia
Colombian brands